Frederick Hoelzel (May 5, 1889 - 1963) was a German American physiologist and fasting researcher, best known for consuming indigestible objects. The press nicknamed Hoelzel the "Human Billygoat".

Biography

Hoelzel was born in Küps, Bavaria and moved to the United States as a child. He was a volunteer physiologist at University of Chicago during 1925-1933 and 1937-1942. He was assistant physiologist during 1942-1956. He aided physiologist Anton Julius Carlson in research work on digestion. He was associated with Carlson for 40 years. Hoelzel lived in small room in a laboratory at the University of Chicago. He received no pay, only bedding and meals.

Hoelzel on different occasions spent time fasting under scientific observation. He fasted for periods of 8-41 consecutive days. His fasting experiment was conducted at the University of Chicago. In 1912, he fasted for 8 days, in 1913 for 26 days and in 1917 for 15 days. The results revealed that his hunger disappeared after 5 days but weakness, fatigue and nausea remained.

Hoelzel swallowed coal powder, gravel, glass beads, rubber, steel balls, surgical cotton, twine, wire and other inert items to show how long they would take to would pass through his intestines.  The objects were mixed with his meals. He volunteered for the unusual experiment because he had already suffered from digestive troubles and hoped the research would aid in
curing indigestion. The results were published in the American Journal of Physiology, 1930. 

Hoelzel was known to have eaten surgical cotton doused with fruit juice for a few days. In 1919, he invented cellulose-based flour. Hoelzel's experiences in nutrition from 1908-1953 are documented in his book A Devotion to Nutrition, published in 1954.

Selected publications

Hoelzel, F. (1930). The Rate of Passage of Inert Materials through the Digestive Tract. American Journal of Physiology 92 (2): 466-497.
Hoelzel, F. (1948). Nutrition and Efficiency. The American Journal of Digestive Diseases 15 (12): 416-421.
 Hoelzel, F; Carlson, A. J. (1949). Relation of Diet to Diverticulosis of the Colon in Rats. Gastroenterology 12: 108-115.
Hoelzel, F; Carlson, A. J. (1952). The Alleged Disappearance of Hunger During Starvation. Science 115 (2993):  526-527.
Hoelzel, F. (1954). A Devotion to Nutrition. New York: Vantage Press.
Hoelzel, F. (1960). Starvation With and Without Painful Hunger Pangs. Science 132 (3430): 841-845.

See also

Michel Lotito (famous for deliberately consuming indigestible objects)
Alexis St. Martin

References

Further reading

Alex Boese. (2012). Electrified Sheep: Bizarre Experiments from the Bestselling Author of Elephants on Acid. Pan Books.

External links

Glass-Eating Scientist Frederick Hoelzel Ate Strange Things Like Charcoal And Sand To Learn About Digestion - Medical Daily
The Man Who Ate Inedible Objects In The Name of Science  - Fusion TV

1889 births
1963 deaths
American nutritionists
American physiologists
Fasting researchers
German emigrants to the United States
University of Chicago staff